Dorkin is a surname. Notable people with the surname include:

 Evan Dorkin (born 1965), American cartoonist
 Jack Dorkin (born 1866), professional footballer
 Viktor Dorkin (1953–2006), Russian politician

See also
 Dorking, a town in England
 Dorking (disambiguation)
 Durkin
 Dworkin (disambiguation); includes Dvorkin